Melarsomine (melaminylthioarsenate) is an arsenic-based anthelmintic. In the U.S., it is marketed under the trade names Immiticide (Merial) and Diroban (Zoetis), and is approved by the FDA's Center for Veterinary Medicine for the treatment of adult heartworm (Dirofilaria immitis) infection in dogs. It is not approved for treatment in cats, or dogs in late-stage infection.

References

External links
 American Heartworm Society

Antiparasitic agents
Organoarsenic dithiolates
Triazines
Organosulfur compounds
Drugs with unknown mechanisms of action